Brenda White (born February 4, 1966) is an American cross-country skier. She competed in the women's 15 kilometre classical event at the 1992 Winter Olympics.

References

External links
 

1966 births
Living people
American female cross-country skiers
Olympic cross-country skiers of the United States
Cross-country skiers at the 1992 Winter Olympics
Sportspeople from Burlington, Vermont
Vermont Catamounts skiers
21st-century American women